Children Of Chaos is the debut album by American alternative metal band Soulidium. The album was released in 2007. The song "Trapped" was also featured on the Saw IV soundtrack. A follow-up to this album, Fly 2 The Sun, is set to release on August 20, 2011.

Track listing

Reception

Critical
411Mania  
CD Universe (4.8/5)
Hard Rock Hideout

Personnel
Soulidium
 Michael McKnight - Vocals/Songwriting
 AJ Maldonado - Guitar
 Eric "Monsieur" Beausoleil - Guitar
 Jake Jaden - Bass
 Danny Cayocca - Drums

Production
 Danny Bernini - producer
 Michael McKnight - producer
 Bob Ludwig - mastering
 Jeff Bova - strings
 Bonnie Milner - vocal production

References

2007 debut albums
Soulidium albums
Albums recorded at Long View Farm